Kazutoki (written: 和時 or 一聡) is a masculine Japanese given name. Notable people with the name include:

, Japanese video game producer
 (born 1949), Japanese jazz saxophonist

Japanese masculine given names